Glyclopyramide (INN, marketed under the tradename Deamelin-S) is a sulfonylurea drug used in the treatment of diabetes. It has been marketed in Japan since 1965.

It is classified as second generation.

References

External links
 DEAMELIN·S Tablets 250 mg

Potassium channel blockers
Benzenesulfonylureas
Pyrrolidines
Chloroarenes